Nusky Ahmed (born 25 March 1999) is a Sri Lankan cricketer. He made his List A debut on 19 December 2019, for Sri Lanka Air Force Sports Club in the 2019–20 Invitation Limited Over Tournament. He made his first-class debut on 14 February 2020, for Sri Lanka Air Force Sports Club in Tier B of the 2019–20 Premier League Tournament.

References

External links
 

1999 births
Living people
Sri Lankan cricketers
Sri Lanka Air Force Sports Club cricketers